Brockhaus may refer to:

 Friedrich Arnold Brockhaus (1772–1823), German encyclopedia publisher and editor
 F.A. Brockhaus AG, his publishing firm
 Brockhaus Enzyklopädie, an encyclopedia published by the firm
 27765 Brockhaus, an asteroid named for him
 Hermann Brockhaus (1806–1877), German orientalist

See also
Brockhaus and Efron Encyclopedic Dictionary, a Russian-language encyclopedia

German-language surnames